Events in the year 1928 in China.

Incumbents
 President – Zhang Zuolin, Tan Yankai, Chiang Kai-shek
 Premier – Pan Fu, Tan Yankai
 Vice Premier – Feng Yuxiang

Events

February
 7 February – Tan Yankai became the first Chairman of the Nationalist Government.

March
 26 March – The China Academy of Art is founded in Hangzhou (originally named the National Academy of Art).

April
 30 April – Beiyang government troops withdrew from Jinan.

May
 3 May – Jinan Incident, an armed conflict between the Japanese Imperial Army allied with Northern Chinese warlords against the Kuomintang's southern army, occurs in Jinan.

June 
 4 June – Huanggutun Incident (Japanese assassination of the Chinese head of state Generalissimo Zhang Zuolin).

July
 1 July – Zhang Xueliang announced an armistice with the Kuomintang and proclaimed that he would not interfere with the re-unification.
 3 July – Chiang Kai-shek arrived in Beijing and met the representative from the Fengtian clique to discuss a peaceful settlement.
 8 July – Looting of the Eastern Mausoleum.
 25 July – The United States recalls its troops from China.

October 
 8 October – Chiang Kai-shek is named as Generalissimo (Chairman of the Military Affairs Commission) of the Nationalist government of the Republic of China.

December
 29 December – Chinese reunification.

Births
1 August – Shen Daren, Chinese politician (d. 2017)
18 August – John Liu Shi-gong, Chinese Roman Catholic bishop (d. 2017)
20 October – Li Peng
Sun Shenlu
Zhao Baotong

Deaths
30 March – Xia Minghan
3 May – Cai Gongshi
3 June – Li Yuanhong
4 June – Zhang Zuolin, Wu Junsheng
14 October – Chen Jue

References

Bibliography 
 Beasley, W.G. (1991). Japanese Imperialism 1894–1945. Oxford University Press. .
 Akira Iriye, After Imperialism: The Search for a New Order in the Far East, 1921–1931 (Cambridge: Harvard University Press, 1965; reprinted:Chicago: Imprint Publications, 1990): 193–205.

External links 
 

 
1920s in China
Years of the 20th century in China